Siri Gjære (born 1 February 1972 in Trondheim, Norway) is a Norwegian jazz vocalist from Levanger, known for her collaborations with musicians like Tord Gustavsen, Stian Carstensen, Eirik Hegdal, Maria Kannegaard, Jarle Bernhoft, Eldbjørg Raknes, and Steinar Raknes.

Career 
Gjære was educated at the jazz program at Trondheim Musikkonservatorium (1995–1997), where she performed with Trondheim Jazz Orchestra (e.g. We Are? 2005, with Eirik Hegdal).  Since 1999 she has been involved with the band "Cricket Club" (with Andreas Aase and Steinar Raknes), the Jazz duo "Aire & Angels" with Tord Gustavsen (two releases), and the soul-rock band "Moving Oos".

Gjære has also worked with children's music and church music, then in cooperation with Eldbjørg Raknes, Stian Carstensen and Steinar Raknes. She was This year's county artist of Sør-Trøndelag 2006, and is "Mona" in the musical Survival Kit, written by Klaus Hagerup, Benedicte Adrian and Ingrid Bjørnov. The music was released on record Survival Kit (2006), and presented at Vossajazz 2007, with additional musicians Maria Kannegaard (electric piano), Jarle Bernhoft (vocals, guitar) and Andreas Tor Haugerud (drums).

Discography

Solo albums 
2001: Love Seriously Damages Health – (Bergland Prod.)
2006: Survival Kit – (Bergland Prod.), with Gunnar Andreas Berg

Collaborative works 
Duo with Tord Gustavsen and "Aire & Angels»
1999: Aire & Angels – (C+C Records)
2002: Aire & Angels II – (Bergland Prod.), with Tord Gustavsen, presenting texts by Rubert Brooke

Duo within Trondheim Jazz Orchestra
2005: We Are? (Jazzaway), works by Eirik Hegdal
2008: Wood And Water (MNJ Records), 24 songs by Eirik Hegdal, with contributions by Gjære, Nils-Olav Johansen, Ståle Storløkken, Ole Morten Vågan and Tor Haugerud

With other projects
2002: Små Sanger Mest I Det Blå – (Bergland Prod.), with Eldbjørg Raknes and Stian Carstensen
2010: Improvoicing – (MNJ Records), with "Trondheim Voices"
2011: Patience for the Little Things (Reflect Records), with Sverre Gjørvad

Singles 
1999: Someone's Working Late Tonight – (Bergland Prod.)

References 

Norwegian women jazz singers
Norwegian jazz composers
Norwegian University of Science and Technology alumni
1972 births
Living people
Musicians from Trondheim
20th-century Norwegian women singers
20th-century Norwegian singers
21st-century Norwegian women singers
21st-century Norwegian singers
Trondheim Jazz Orchestra members
Trondheim Voices members
People from Levanger